Parzival is a band from Copenhagen, Denmark. Their musical style is somewhat reminiscent of that of Slovenian pioneers Laibach, but differs from it in that it has a less electronic sound, and incorporates elements of medieval music, Gregorian chants, and an overall epic feel. All of the band's lyrics are in German and Latin (except Noblesse Oblige LP, lyrics of which are mainly in Russian by famous Russian poets of the 19th century, like Alexander Pushkin), to suit the group's highly Wagnerian style.

The core of the band is Dimitrij Bablevskij, originally from Russia, but quite a few Danish guest musicians appear on their albums.

Though hard to define, the band's music appeals mainly to the goth, metal, neo-folk and industrial scenes, and has achieved a modest cult following within their respective subcultures.

The band was earlier known as Stiff Miners, releasing two albums (Giselle and Vox Celesta) under that moniker. Their current name comes from Wolfram von Eschenbach's 13th-century German poem Parzival.

Discography 
1994 – Giselle (as Stiff Miners / CD)
1997 – Vox Celesta (as Stiff Miners / CD)
1999 – Anathema Maranatha (CD)
2000 – Blut und Jordan (CD)
2004 – Noblesse Oblige (LP)
2006 – Deus Nobiscum (CD)
2008 – Zeitgeist/Noblesse Oblige (CD)
2011 – Urheimat (CD)
2012 – Die Kulturnacht (CD)
2014 – Casta (CD)
2018 – Urheimat Neugeburt (LP,CD)

External links

 Parzival on MySpace
 Parzival on Bandcamp
 Interview on Lastsigh
 Parzival on Discogs

Danish musical groups
Dark wave musical groups
Industrial music groups